was a Japanese daimyō of the late Edo period, who ruled the Sasayama Domain. He served as a rōjū in the Tokugawa shogunate.

Gallery

References
Bolitho, Harold (1974). Treasures among men; the fudai daimyo in Tokugawa Japan. New Haven: Yale University Press.

1806 births
1864 deaths
Daimyo
Rōjū